The Brooklyn Marathon is an NYCRUNS race that debuted in 2011 which was held in the fall with the main course centered around Prospect Park.  The race generated enough support that plans for new courses began in 2013.  The Brooklyn Marathon returned in 2022 following the COVID-19 pandemic with a new course that goes from Williamsburg to Prospect Park and also added a half marathon on the same day. Inside the race Making a return on April 24, 2022, with a new and improved route, the Brooklyn Marathon started in north Brooklyn and ended in Historic Brooklyn. Racers made their way along the course, and passed scenes of bridges, rivers, and other views of Manhattan. Like other marathons, food, drinks, and hospitality lined the race every 1.5 miles. During the race in April 2022, they were expected to have 20,000 participants.  The 2022 race had $100,000 total in prize money and the winners of each category were: From New York City, the winner of the non-binary field was Jake Caswell; From Ethiopia, the winner of the women's field was Hirut Guangul. From New York City, the winner of the men's field was Aaron Mora.  The marathon also had the largest nonbinary group with a total of 82 finishers which also includes the half-marathon. The organization, NYCRUNS, founded the Brooklyn Marathon and Half Marathon first in 2011. NYCRUNS hosts over 2 dozen running events, but the Brooklyn Marathon and half marathon are their most significant. COVID-19 However, during the COVID-19 pandemic in 2020, the race was shut down from 2020-2021. Sponsorships With the return of the iconic NYC Marathon, NYCRUNS partnered with Adidas on a multi-year contract. Adidas agreed to make attire for all athletes and staff members participating in the event.

References

External links

Brooklyn
Marathons in the United States
Running in the United States